Simlabari is a village in Goalpara district, Assam, India. As per the 2011 Census of India, Simlabari village has a total population of 5,516 people including 2,798 males and 2,718 females with a literacy rate of 50.87%.

References 

Villages in Goalpara district